The 1994 Vuelta a Andalucía was the 40th edition of the Vuelta a Andalucía cycle race and was held on 8 February to 13 February 1994. The race started in Chiclana and finished in Granada. The race was won by Stefano Della Santa.

General classification

References

Vuelta a Andalucia
Vuelta a Andalucía by year
1994 in Spanish sport